The Girls' Youth South American Volleyball Championship is a sport competition for national women's volleyball teams with players under 19 years, currently held biannually and organized by the Confederación Sudamericana de Voleibol (CSV), the South American volleyball federation.

Results summary

Medals summary

MVP by edition
1978 – 2000 – Unknown
2002 – 
2004 – 
2006 – 
2008 – 
2010 – 
2012 – 
2014 – 
2016 – 
2018 – 
2022 –

See also

 Boys' Youth South American Volleyball Championship
 Women's U22 South American Volleyball Championship
 Women's Junior South American Volleyball Championship
 Girls' U16 South American Volleyball Championship

References
CSV

 
U18
U18
Recurring sporting events established in 1978
International volleyball competitions
International women's volleyball competitions
Youth volleyball
Biennial sporting events
1978 establishments in South America